The men's sanda 75 kilograms competition at the 2014 Asian Games in Incheon, South Korea was held from 21 September to 24 September at the Ganghwa Dolmens Gymnasium.

Sanda is an unsanctioned fight is a Chinese self-defense system and combat sport. Amateur Sanda allows kicks, punches, knees (not to the head), and throws.

A total of 12 men from 12 different countries competed in this event, limited to fighters whose body weight was less than 75 kilograms.

Kim Myeong-jin from South Korea won the gold medal after beating Hamid Reza Ladvar of Iran in gold medal bout 2–1. The bronze medal was shared by Nursultan Tursynkulov from Kazakhstan and Ngô Văn Sỹ of Vietnam. Athletes from Macau, India, Lebanon and Jordan lost in the second round and finished 5th.

Schedule
All times are Korea Standard Time (UTC+09:00)

Results
Legend
KO — Won by knockout
TV — Technical victory

References

External links
Official website

Men's sanda 75 kg